Rimi Barnali Chatterjee is an Indian author and professor of English at Jadavpur University.

Career
Chatterjee is an author, translator, and professor of English at Jadavpur University. She completed her Ph.D at Oxford University in 1997. She began teaching at Jadavpur University in 2004. During her time as a professor, Chatterjee and professor Abhijit Gupta helped develop one of the first programs to include the study of comics as part of the study of literature. Chatterjee also contributed to the comics magazine Drighangchoo produced by the English department and has created other comics.

Selected publications

Novels
 Black Light (2010)
 The City of Love (2007)
 Signal Red (2005)

Stories
 "The Garden of Bombahia", about sixteenth-century scientist and heretic Garcia da Orta, appeared in Wasafiri 24(3): pp. 98–106.
 "The First Rasa", about a woman printer in Calcutta's nineteenth-century pleasure district, came out in Kolkata: Book City: Readings, Fragments, Images, ed. Sria Chatterjee and Jennie Renton (Edinburgh: Textualities, 2009).
 "Jessica", about an Anglo-Indian woman hairdresser of Portuguese descent in a Bengali neighbourhood in Calcutta, came out in Vislumbres: Bridging India and Iberoamerica 1 (2008): pp. 58–9.
 "The Key to All the Worlds", appeared in Superhero: The Fabulous Adventures of Rocket Kumar and Other Indian Superheroes, published by Scholastic India in 2007. 
"A Night with the Joking Clown". (2019). In Saint, Tarun K. (ed.). The Gollancz Book of South Asian Science Fiction.
 "Arisudan" (Mithila Review #15, 2021)

Graphic stories
  "How Zigsa Found Her Way" in the Longform Anthology published by HarperCollins India.
 "Killer" in Comix India Vol. 2: Girl Power
 "The Bookshop on the Hill" in Drighangchoo Issue 3, Kolkata 2010. Part 2 of the story forthcoming in Drighangchoo Issue 4.

Other books
Empires of the Mind: A History of the Oxford University Press in India During the Raj (2006)
Apon Katha: My Story by Abanindranath Tagore (translation from Bengali to English) (Chennai: Tara, 2004)
Titu Mir by Mahasweta Devi (Bhattacharya) (translation from Bengali to English) (Calcutta: Seagull, 2000)

Honors and awards
 2007 SHARP DeLong Prize for History of the Book (Empires of the Mind: A History of the Oxford University Press in India During the Raj) 
 2007 English Fiction shortlist, Vodafone Crossword Book Award (City of Love)

References

Living people
Indian women novelists
Indian science fiction writers
20th-century Indian translators
Writers from Kolkata
Women science fiction and fantasy writers
Indian women translators
20th-century Indian women writers
20th-century Indian novelists
21st-century Indian novelists
21st-century Indian short story writers
Indian women short story writers
21st-century Indian biographers
Indian women non-fiction writers
Women biographers
21st-century Indian translators
21st-century Indian women writers
21st-century Indian writers
Female comics writers
Year of birth missing (living people)